A Chicagoan is a native or resident of the city of Chicago (see Demographics of Chicago).  

Chicagoan may also refer to:

 Chicagoan (ATSF train), American passenger train running between Chicago and Kansas City
 Chicagoan (NYC train), American passenger train running between Chicago and New York
 Chicagoan (DLW train), American passenger train running between Hoboken and Chicago
 The Chicagoan, American magazine (1926-1935) modeled after The New Yorker